Thomas William Bettis (March 17, 1933 – February 28, 2015) was an All-American football linebacker, NFL player, and NFL coach. After starring at Purdue, Bettis was selected by the Green Bay Packers in the first round of the 1955 NFL Draft 5th overall.  He played nine seasons for the Packers, the Pittsburgh Steelers, and the Chicago Bears. After his playing career, Bettis went on to coach in the NFL for 30 years, including for the 1969–70 Super Bowl IV champions and the 1966–67 AFL champions, the Kansas City Chiefs. Bettis served as interim coach of the Chiefs in 1977 after the firing of Paul Wiggin. In seven games as head coach, Bettis compiled a 1–6 record, ending a 12-year stint as a coach of the Chiefs. He returned in 1988 to be the defensive backs coach of the Chiefs. He was inducted into both the Purdue University Athletic Hall of Fame and the Chicagoland Sports Hall of Fame.

Bettis died on February 28, 2015.

See also
 1954 College Football All-America Team
 Chicagoland Sports Hall of Fame

References

1933 births
2015 deaths
Sportspeople from Chicago
Players of American football from Chicago
American football linebackers
Purdue Boilermakers football players
Green Bay Packers players
Pittsburgh Steelers players
Chicago Bears players
Coaches of American football from Illinois
Kansas City Chiefs coaches
Kansas City Chiefs head coaches
St. Louis Cardinals (football) coaches
Cleveland Browns coaches
Houston Oilers coaches
Philadelphia Eagles coaches
Los Angeles Rams coaches